Kaunas Jazz is an annual international jazz festival in Kaunas, Lithuania. It started in 1991, soon after Lithuania declared re-establishment of independence from the Soviet Union. The festival experienced difficulties at first, due to a shaky economic situation, but it is now the biggest and most popular jazz festival in Baltic states. In the beginning it was held only in the spring (late April), but it now features a small series in fall and another series just before Christmas. The festival strives to include many different styles and genres of jazz.

Artists from over 20 countries have participated in the festival, including Al Di Meola, John Scofield, Niels-Henning Ørsted Pedersen, Elvin Jones, Jan Garbarek, Charles Lloyd, Bobo Stenson, Nils Landgren, Courtney Pine, Marc Copland, John Abercrombie, Palle Mikkelborg, Nils Petter Molvaer, David Sanborn, Mike Stern, Trilok Gurtu, Bobby Previte, Greg Osby, and Chico Freeman.

External links
 Official website
 Baltic Times article on jazz in Lithuania
 Description at Europe Jazz Network

Jazz festivals in Lithuania
Events in Kaunas
Recurring events established in 1991
Music in Kaunas
1991 establishments in Lithuania
Annual events in Lithuania